In statistics, the mean percentage error (MPE) is the computed average of percentage errors by which forecasts of a model differ from actual values of the quantity being forecast.

The formula for the mean percentage error is:

 

where at is the actual value of the quantity being forecast,  ft is the forecast, and n is the number of different times for which the variable is forecast.

Because actual rather than absolute values of the forecast errors are used in the formula, positive and negative forecast errors can offset each other; as a result the formula can be used as a measure of the bias in the forecasts.

A disadvantage of this measure is that it is undefined whenever a single actual value is zero.

See also
Percentage error
Mean absolute percentage error
Mean squared error
Mean squared prediction error
Minimum mean-square error
Squared deviations
Peak signal-to-noise ratio
Root mean square deviation
Errors and residuals in statistics

References
 
 

Summary statistics